Compsophis is a genus of harmless snakes in the family Pseudoxyrhophiidae. The genus is found only on the island of Madagascar.

Species
Seven species are recognized as being valid.
Compsophis albiventris 
Compsophis boulengeri 
Compsophis fatsibe 
Compsophis infralineatus 
Compsophis laphystius 
Compsophis vinckei 
Compsophis zeny 

Nota bene: A binomial authority in parentheses indicates that the species was originally described in a genus other than Compsophis.

Etymology
The specific name, boulengeri, is in honor of Belgian-born British herpetologist George Albert Boulenger.

References

External links

Further reading
Boulenger GA (1896). Catalogue of the Snakes in the British Museum (Natural History). Volume III., Containing the Colubridæ (Opisthoglyphæ and Proteroglyphæ) ... London: Trustees of the British Museum (Natural History). (Taylor and Francis, printers). xiv + 727 pp. + Plates I-XXV. (Genus Compsophis, pp. 609–610; species C. albiventris, p. 610).
Glaw F, Nagy ZT, Vences M (2007). "Phylogenetic relationships and classification of the Malagasy pseudoxyrhophiine snake genera Geodipsas and Compsophis based on morphological and molecular data". Zootaxa 1517: 53–62.
Mocquard F (1894). "Reptiles nouveaux ou insuffisamment connus de Madagascar ". Compte-rendu Sommaire des Séances de la Société philomathique de Paris, Huitième Série [Eighth Series] 6 (17): 3–10. (Compsophis, new genus, p. 8; C. albiventris, new species, pp. 8–9). (in French).

Pseudoxyrhophiidae
Reptiles of Madagascar
Endemic fauna of Madagascar
Snake genera
Taxa named by François Mocquard